Henry Duncan (24 November 1735 – 7 October 1814) was an officer of the Royal Navy, who saw service in the American War of Independence. Duncan was born in Dundee, Scotland to Alexander Duncan, Town Clerk of Dundee, and Isobel Crawford.

Career
Duncan began his sea life in the merchant service, possibly in that of the East India Company, but entered the Royal Navy on in 1755 joining . Duncan later joined . On 3 January 1759, Duncan passed his examination for lieutenant and joined .

He married Mary French in Dartmouth, on 27 November 1761. During this time he had two children, Isabella (born 23 August 1764) and Arthur French (born 9 February 1769). Duncan already had an older son, Henry, who later served in the Navy from 1781 until being lost off the coast of Newfoundland in 1802 with HMS Scout.

On 26 May 1768, Duncan was promoted to commander and joined . Soon after he was promoted to captain. His career in North America lasted for the next six to seven years. On the commands of General Howe, Duncan commanded an invasion fleet of 26 ships carrying 2,000 men led by General William Tryon from New York to Westport, Connecticut, to raid Continental Army supply depots in Danbury, Connecticut, on 22 April 1777, resulting in the Battle of Ridgefield.

Duncan later returned to Europe to participate in the relief of Gibraltar in 1781.

He was appointed Commissioner at Halifax. He participated in the North British Society. He was appointed to the Nova Scotia Council in 1788, resigning in 1801. Duncan remained at Halifax until 1799, when he returned to England, to be appointed Commissioner at Sheerness, and Deputy-Comptroller of the Navy in January, 1801. He retired ifrom the post in 1806 and resided at Dartmouth until his death on 7 October 1814. His widow Mary survived until 25 September 1823.

Notes 

a.  The parish records of Dundee indicate that the birth date of "24 November 1735" is incorrect

The Parish Records of Dundee, Angus, Scotland 
Born 24 January 1739 Baptised 27 January 1739 
Henry son of Mr Alexr Duncan, Clerk and Isabel Crawford 
In commemoration of Henry Crawford late of Monorgan, grandfather, Henry Crawford of Monorgan, uncle

References
Laughton, J. K. "Journals of Henry Duncan, Captain, Royal Navy 1776–1782." The Naval Miscellany, Vol. I.
"Captain Henry Duncan RN 1735–1814." Clan Duncan Society. 13 May 2008. 20 May 2008. <http://www.clan-duncan.co.uk/henry-duncan-rn.html> originally from <http://freepages.genealogy.rootsweb.ancestry.com/~kaub/Myers/hd1739.htm>.

|-

1735 births
1814 deaths
Military personnel from Dundee
Royal Navy personnel of the American Revolutionary War
Royal Navy officers
18th-century Royal Navy personnel